HMS Elfin has been the name of more than one British Royal Navy ship, and may refer to:

 , a paddle yacht launched in 1849 and used for many years as a despatch-boat by the royal court, placed on the sale list in 1901
 , a tender, formerly the War Department vessel Dundas, transferred to the Royal Navy in 1905 and sold in 1928
 , a torpedo recovery vessel launched in 1933, renamed Nettle in 1941, sold in 1957, and now preserved in the Netherlands as Elfin

Elfin